Thomas R Davies was a Welsh lawn bowls international who competed in the 1934 British Empire Games.

Bowls career
At the 1934 British Empire Games he won the bronze medal in the pairs event with Stan Weaver.

He bowled for the Swansea Bowls Club, was a Welsh international from 1926-1936 and won three Welsh national titles in 1927 & 1933 (rinks/fours) and 1934 (pairs).

References

Welsh male bowls players
Bowls players at the 1934 British Empire Games
Commonwealth Games bronze medallists for Wales
Commonwealth Games medallists in lawn bowls
Medallists at the 1934 British Empire Games